Nicoleta Matei (born 1 February 1970), known by her stage name Nico, is a Romanian singer and TV personality. She collaborated with several Romanian hip hop artists, such as Morometzii (in 1999), B.U.G. Mafia (in 2000, 2002), Cabron (in 2003, 2007, 2010), Puya, Blat Jargon, and Codu Penal. She represented Romania along with Vlad in the Eurovision Song Contest 2008 with the song "Pe-o margine de lume".

In 2017 she was chosen by Walt Disney Pictures to provide the Romanian voice of Mrs. Potts in the live-action movie Beauty and The Beast.

Discography

Studio albums
 2003 Gand Pentru Ei
 2005 Asa Cum Vrei
 2007 Cast Away
 2010 Love Mail
 2016 Motive

Singles
"Nu Pot sa Mai Suport", featuring Cabron
"Asa Cum Vrei" Peak: 98, Romanian Top 100
"Vocea Inimii"
"Cast Away"
"Dulce Amaruie"
"Pe-o Margine De Lume" Peak: 24, Romanian Top 100
"Love Mail" Peak: 3, Romanian Top 100
"Poate Undeva"
"Mai Da-Mi O Sansa"
"100 De Zile"
"9", featuring F.Charm
"Clipe" featuring Shobby
"Alt Inceput" featuring Sonny Flame
"In Locul Tau"
"(Sa-mi Dai) Motive"
"Indestructibili"
"A Little Late"
"Suflet Pereche (Stai Langa Mine)"
"Nebuni Indragostiti"
"Oare Cine"
"Vine Craciunul"
"Amintirile Nu Mor"
"Vara Pentru Amandoi" / "Corazon Partido"
"4 Pereti"
"Scopul si Durata"
"Esti Liber"
"Trenul Vietii"
"Magia De Craciun" featuring Connect-R
"La Fel Și Eu"
"Oscar De Dor" featuring Cabron

Music competitions, awards and nominations

References

External links 

 Official site

1970 births
Living people
Eurovision Song Contest entrants of 2008
Eurovision Song Contest entrants for Romania
Place of birth missing (living people)
21st-century Romanian singers
21st-century Romanian women singers